Léonard Daghelinckx (10 April 1900 – 3 March 1986) was a Belgian cyclist. He competed at the 1920 and 1924 Summer Olympics. At the 1924 Games, he won a bronze medal in the men's team pursuit.

References

External links
 

1900 births
1986 deaths
Belgian male cyclists
Olympic cyclists of Belgium
Cyclists at the 1920 Summer Olympics
Cyclists at the 1924 Summer Olympics
Olympic bronze medalists for Belgium
Olympic medalists in cycling
Medalists at the 1924 Summer Olympics
Cyclists from Antwerp
20th-century Belgian people